Lily is the second solo studio album by Australian singer-songwriter Wendy Matthews released by rooArt in Australia on 28 September 1992 (see 1992 in music). Matthews travelled to Canada with her mother for the album to discover their heritage, which influences the album. Matthews states the album "overall, has vulnerability . . . [it is] really heart on your sleeve stuff". The album won Matthews the ARIA Award for Best Female Artist at the ARIA Music Awards of 1993. It yielded four singles; "The Day You Went Away", "Friday's Child", "If Only I Could" and "T.K.O.".

The album reached #2 on the Australian album charts and was certified triple-platinum in Australia.

A limited edition version was later released with a bonus CD, IX, of live tracks. The first five tracks on the bonus disc were recorded live at the Montreux Jazz Festival, July 1993 and the last track is a French version of "The Day You Went Away".

The album was also released in North American and Europe on Atlantic/WEA.

Track listing
All songwriters as listed
 "Friday's Child" (David Munday, Sandy Stewart) – 3:56
 "Walk Away" (B. Hogan, J. Koller) – 4:04
 "T.K.O." (Cecil Womack) – 5:20
 "Mother Can’t Do" (Robbie James) – 4:32
 "Quiet Art" (W. Matthews, M. O'Connor) – 5:47
 "The Day You Went Away" (Mark Batson, Edward Male Jonathon) – 4:39
 "If Only I Could" (Ralf Hamm, Markus Stabb, Sydney Youngblood, Claus Zundel) – 4:39
 "Homecoming Song" (Robbie James) – 5:01
 "Face of Appalachia" (Lowell George, John Sebastian) – 5:26
 "Naming Names" (S. Lynch, P. White) – 4:39
 "Inexorably Yours" (John Joseph Gordon) – 3:16

 Limited edition bonus disc - IX
 "The Water Is Wide" (Traditional) – 3:57
 "Square Moon" (K. Govett, G. Stapleton, R. James) – 4:06
 "Doomsday Lullaby" (Danny Bruce Peck) – 4:26
 "Going Back to My Roots" (Dozier Lamont Herbert) – 5:26
 "The Weavers Song" – 1:52
 "The Day You Went Away (French Version)" (Batson, Jonathon; French lyrics by Wendy Matthews) – 4:35

Credits
 Wendy Matthews — vocals
 Jon Farriss — drums, percussion
 Garry Gary Beers — bass
 Booker T. Jones — keyboards
 Robbie James — guitar

Release history

Charts

End of year charts

Certifications

References

1992 albums
ARIA Award-winning albums
Wendy Matthews albums